Pedro Pablo Martínez Ledesma was a Peruvian politician in the late 1940s. He was the mayor of Lima from 1949 to 1950.

References

Mayors of Lima